Dawn of the Shinsengumi is a prequel to the first two seasons of the anime series Hakuoki. It focuses on a boy named Ryunosuke Ibuki, who is saved and made into a servant by the leader of the Roshigumi, Kamo Serizawa. Serizawa's recklessness and abuse of authority causes a bad reputation for the Roshigumi. This creates opposition within the Roshigumi, mainly from Toshizo Hijikata and Isami Kondou. The Roshigumi is then approached by Koudou Yukimura, a doctor who offers an elixir which can increase physical prowess, but at the cost of the drinker's sanity.

The anime is produced by Studio Deen. The opening theme is "Reimei -reimei-" by Maon Kurosaki and the ending is "Hana no Atosaki" by Aika Yoshioka.

Episode list

References

Hakuoki episode lists